"A more perfect Union" refers to a phrase in the preamble to the United States Constitution that begins with "to form".

A More Perfect Union may also refer to:

Books 
 A More Perfect Union: Advancing New American Rights, a 2001 book by Jesse Jackson, Jr.
 A More Perfect Union: What We the People Can Do to Reclaim Our Constitutional Liberties, a 2015 book Ben Carson (written with Candy Carson)

Film and television 
 A More Perfect Union (film), a 1989 film depicting the writing of the Constitution of the United States
 "A More Perfect Union", season 2 finale (2012) of Falling Skies
 "A More Perfect Union", season 4 episode (2013) of The Good Wife
 "A More Perfect Union", season 2 episode 13 (2015) of The Last Ship
 "A More Perfect Union", season 5 episode 6 (2016) of Person of Interest

Music 
 More Perfect Union, a 1987 album by Icon
 A More Perfect Union, a 2012 album by Pete Seeger and Lorre Wyatt
 A More Perfect Union, song from the 2010 Titus Andronicus album The Monitor

Other uses
 A More Perfect Union (speech), a 2008 speech by Barack Obama
 More Perfect Union, an American progressive news media organization
More Perfect, a spinoff podcast from WNYC's Radiolab.

See also
Solemn Declaration on European Union, which refers to an "ever closer union among the peoples and Member States of the European Community"